Mounir Bordjah (born July 1, 1997) is an Algerian footballer who plays for MO Béjaïa in the Algerian Ligue Professionnelle 1. On May 12, 2017, Bordjah made his senior debut as a starter in a league match against USM Bel-Abbès.

References

External links
 

1997 births
Algerian footballers
Algerian Ligue Professionnelle 1 players
Kabyle people
Living people
MO Béjaïa players
People from Béjaïa Province
Association football fullbacks
21st-century Algerian people